The Javan treeshrew (Tupaia hypochrysa) or large Javan treeshrew is a treeshrew species within the Tupaiidae family. It was originally described as a subspecies of Tupaia ferruginea and later listed as a junior synonym of Tupaia glis, but was raised up to species status in 2013. It is found on the island of Java in Indonesia.

References 

Treeshrews
Endemic fauna of Indonesia
Mammals of Indonesia